Aurelia Ramos de Segarra (1860–1927) was a Uruguayan philanthropist.

In 1897, on the wake of the Revolution of 1897, she helped establish the Red Cross of Christian Ladies. Later on it was renamed Uruguayan Red Cross.

Literature

References 

1860 births
1927 deaths
Uruguayan activists
Uruguayan philanthropists
People associated with the International Red Cross and Red Crescent Movement